The 1958 Sacramento State Hornets football team represented Sacramento State College—now known as California State University, Sacramento—as a member of the Far Western Conference (FWC) during the 1958 NCAA College Division football season. Led by second-year head coach John W. Baker, Sacramento State compiled an overall record of 3–6 with a mark of 1–4 in conference play, placing last out of six teams in the FWC. The team finished with the first winning record in its four years of existence. For the season the team was outscored by its opponents 164 to 146. The Hornets played home games at Grant Stadium in Sacramento, California.

Schedule

Team players in the NFL
The following Sacramento State players were selected in the 1959 NFL Draft.

Notes

References

Sacramento State
Sacramento State Hornets football seasons
Sacramento State Hornets football